Aeciospores are one of several different types of spores formed by Rusts.
They each have two nuclei and are typically seen in chain-like formations in the aecium.

References 

Fungal morphology and anatomy